The Cupertino Union School District (abbreviated as CUSD) is a school district in Santa Clara County, California. CUSD's jurisdiction covers the communities of Cupertino, San Jose, Sunnyvale, Santa Clara, Saratoga, and Los Altos. CUSD operates seventeen elementary schools (K-5) and five middle schools (6-8), and one (K-8) school. It is a feeder for the Fremont Union High School District.

Schools 
Colloquial names of schools are in bold.

Elementary schools (K-5) 
 Blue Hills Elementary School, Saratoga. Principal: Ann Mitchel
 L. P. Collins Elementary School, Cupertino. Principal: Kerstin Johnson
 Manuel De Vargas Elementary School, San Jose. Principal: Stephanie Park
 Nelson S. Dilworth Elementary School, San Jose. Principal: Steven Kaufman
 C. B. Eaton Elementary School, Cupertino. Principal: Cynthia Ho
 Dwight D. Eisenhower Elementary School, Santa Clara. Principal: Joanne Conner
 Garden Gate Elementary School, Cupertino. Principal: Norma Salas
 Abraham Lincoln Elementary School, Cupertino. Principal: Ann Kropp
 Montclaire Elementary School, Los Altos. Principal: Amy Maiden
 John Muir Elementary School, San Jose. Principal: Jennifer Lashier 
 Chester W. Nimitz Elementary School, Sunnyvale. Principal: Celestina Pakel
 D. J. Sedgwick Elementary School, Cupertino. Principal: Amanda Clark
 Stevens Creek Elementary School, Cupertino. Principal: Melissa Maisen
 Louis E. Stocklmeir Elementary School, Sunnyvale. Principal: Brandi Hucko
 West Valley Elementary School, Sunnyvale. Principal: ChiaChing Lin

Middle schools (6-8)  
 Cupertino Middle School, Sunnyvale. Principal: Jean Wang
 Warren E. Hyde Middle School, Cupertino. Principal: Ethel Anumba
 John F. Kennedy Middle School, Cupertino. Principal: Joseph Nuno
 Sam H. Lawson Middle School, Cupertino. Principal: Erin Leary
 Joaquin Miller Middle School, San Jose. Principal: Amy Steele

Alternative program schools 
 Cupertino Language Immersion Program (CLIP), San Jose (K-8; located on the campus of Muir Elementary School for K-5 and on the campus of Miller Middle School for 6-8) 
 William Faria Elementary School, Cupertino (K-5) Principal: Mary Alarid-Enright
 Christa McAuliffe (Elementary) School, Saratoga (K-8) Principal: Adrienne VanGorden
 Murdock-Portal (Portal) Elementary School, San Jose (K-5; formerly known as Carol Murdock Elementary School until closed in 1980. Reopened as Murdock-Portal when the Portal Elementary School was closed, and the students and teachers moved to the Murdock location.) Principal: Alison Luvara

Closed schools 
 Calabazas Creek Elementary (closed after 1974–1975 school year; demolished) 
 Doyle School (demolished in 1980; now Barrington Bridge neighborhood)
 C. B. Eaton Elementary School (closed in 1983, later reopened and currently operating) 
 Fremont Older Elementary School (closed 1994; demolished, acquired by Cupertino through Measure T along with Black Berry Farm, now Creekside Park) 
 Grant School (closed 1979, mostly demolished for new homes; a portion is now Grant Park and a few original buildings serve as Grant Park Community Center) 
 Hansen Elementary School (closed in 1979; reopened and now Christa McAuliffe School) 
 Herbert Hoover Elementary School (closed 1981, demolished; now Hoover Park and accompanying homes) 
 Inverness Elementary School (closed 1978, demolished; now part of Sunnyvale Birdlands neighborhood) 
 Jollyman Elementary School (closed after 1981–1982 school year; demolished for construction of new houses (Jollyman Park)) 
 Luther Elementary School (closed 1982; retained by district as reserve campus; buildings now leased to private schools with attached field serving as a neighborhood park) 
 R. I. Meyerholz Elementary School (closed 2022 due to declining enrollment)
 Monta Vista Elementary School (now Monta Vista Park; a few buildings remain and are used by Cupertino as an auxiliary Recreation Center)  
 Carol Murdock Elementary School (closed 1980; reopened 1995 when the Portal alternative program was moved, making room for the Collins Elementary transition and build out of Lawson Middle School on the Collins site).
 Nan Allen School (closed; retained by district as reserve campus; now utilized half by district to house the TRC (Teacher Resource Center) and half leased out) 
 Ortega Junior High School (facilities merged with adjoining Stocklmeir Elementary School) 
 Panama School (closed 1978, demolished; now Panama Park) 
 Portal Elementary School, including Nan Allen School on same site (closed 1983, now reopened as Collins Elementary School) 
 William Regnart Elementary School (closed 2022 due to declining enrollment)
 San Antonio School (closed 1974 or soon after, now San Antonio Park and South Peninsula Hebrew Day School; one of four original one room school houses in CUSD, later moved to Astoria site in Sunnyvale before closing) 
 Serra Elementary School (closed 1981; retained by district as reserve campus; buildings now leased to private schools with adjoining park leased to city) 
 Laura B. Stichter School (closed after 1977–1978 school year; demolished)  
 Earl Warren Elementary School (closed 1975; now Jenny Strand Park, Santa Clara) 
 Wilson Elementary School (closed 1975, demolished; now Wilson Park) 
 Zarevich Site (Prune & Apricot orchard land purchased from Antone Zarevich family. Agricultural land that was purchased for a new school site during enrollment growth, but never developed into school site.  Later sold, near current-day Interstate Freeway 280 and Lawrence Expy adjacent to 5301 Stevens Creek/Agilent Campus).

See also 

 Williams v. Vidmar

References

External links 

OnPass referencing CUSD closures planning 1970-1980

Cupertino Union School District
Cupertino, California
School districts in California
School districts in Santa Clara County, California